The term course of dealing is defined in the Uniform Commercial Code as follows:

A "course of dealing" is a sequence of conduct concerning previous transactions between the parties to a particular transaction that is fairly to be regarded as establishing a common basis of understanding for interpreting their expressions and other conduct.

UCC § 1-303(b). "Course of dealing," as defined in subsection (b), is restricted, literally, to a sequence of conduct between the parties previous to the agreement. A sequence of conduct after or under the agreement, however, is a "course of performance."

Even though, according to the parol evidence rule, words and terms in a writing intended to be the final expression of the agreement of the parties may not be contradicted by extrinsic evidence of a prior or contemporaneous agreement, extrinsic evidence in the form of course of dealing nonetheless may be used to explain or supplement the writing. An integration clause in a contract, stating that the parties intend the writing to be a complete and exclusive statement of the terms of the agreement does not suffice to negate the importance of course of dealing, "because these are such an integral part of the contract that they are not normally disclaimed by general language in the merger clause."

Under the common law, extrinsic evidence such as course of dealing could be considered only if the written contract was ambiguous. By contrast, "Under the UCC, the lack of facial ambiguity in the contract language is basically irrelevant to whether extrinsic evidence ought to be considered by the court as an initial matter."

Evidence of course of dealing will be disallowed, however, if it is "carefully negated" in the parties' contract by "specific and unequivocal" language.

Although the term is usually used in US contract law, where the parties' course of dealing helps the court to understand the intention of the contracting parties, it is also used elsewhere in the law. In US patent law the term is used to help interpret the meaning of words used in patent claims by examining the prosecution history of a patent to determine what meaning the applicant and patent examiner understood claim words to have. It has been observed in the Federal Circuit:

The prosecution history often proves useful in determining a patent's scope, for it reveals the course of dealing with the Patent Office, which may show a particular meaning attached to the terms, or a position taken by the applicant to ensure that the patent would issue.

References

Legal terminology
Business law
Uniform Acts
Uniform Commercial Code
United States contract law